Buckle is an English surname, and may refer to:

 Andrew Buckle (born 1982), Australian golfer
 Baldrick Buckle (born 1972), British artist
 Bill Buckle (born 1943), Australian cricketer and automobile designer
 Bobby Buckle (1869–1959), English footballer
 Catherine Buckle, Zimbabwean writer
 Charles G. Palmer-Buckle (born 1950), Ghanaian Catholic archbishop
 Claude Buckle (1905–1973), English painter
 Claude Buckle (admiral) (1803–1894), English naval officer
 Desmond Buckle (1910–1964), Ghanaian political activist
 Francis Buckle (1766–1832), English jockey
 George Earle Buckle (1854–1935), English editor and biographer
 Harry Buckle (1882–?), Irish footballer 
 Henry Thomas Buckle (1821–1862), English historian
 John Buckle (1867–1925), British trade unionist and politician
 John William Buckle, solicitor, director of the New Zealand Company in 1825
Lynn Buckle ( 2022), Irish writer
 Paul Buckle (born 1970), English footballer
 Richard Buckle (1916–2001), British ballet critic
 Robert Buckle (1802–1893), English clergyman
 Ted Buckle (1924–1990), English footballer
 Terry Buckle (1940–2020), Canadian archbishop
 Walter Clutterbuck Buckle (1886–1955), Canadian politician